The Moscow Watchdog (tr. ) is a breed of dog that was bred in the former Soviet Union. It descends from crosses between the St. Bernard and Caucasian Shepherd Dog. It contains the physical size, attractiveness and intelligence of a St. Bernard and the awareness and assertive traits of a Caucasian Shepherd Dog.

The breed is very large and weight is between 45 and 68 kg (100 and 150 lbs) with a life expectancy of 9-11 years. They are known to be a large powerful breed with a gentle temperament, therefore if it is raised properly with training with discipline, the Moscow Watchdog could fit into any environment and be the perfect protective family pet. Unlike its modern St. Bernard counterparts, the breed needs much vigorous exercise. They can drool, like many of the other molossers. Until recently, Moscow Watchdogs were uncommon outside of Russia and the former Soviet states; however, they are now becoming more popular in Europe and have recently reached the United States. The first litter of Moscow Watchdogs was born in the US on June 6, 2015. There are currently 27 Moscow Watchdogs living in the United States.

Appearance 
Related to livestock guardian dogs, the Moscow Watchdog, one of the larger dog breeds, stands between 64 and 69 cm (25 and 27 inches) tall and weighs 45 to 68 kg (100 to 150 pounds).

Temperament 
The Moscow Watchdog is fine in temperament, but it requires training and early socialisation with both people and animals. In this relationship, Moscow Watchdog is known to be a gentle giant, assertive and protective to his family when in danger.

Health concern 
The Moscow Watchdog is generally a healthy breed, but still has a risk to be prone to hip dysplasia and other large dog breeds’ problems.

History 

During the period after World War II, Russia needed thousands of guard dogs due to the rising crime, a breed of dog that could adapt to a very low temperature , snowy environment during winter and to be able to guard nearly everything that was owned by the government, such as warehouses, railroads, labor camps and infrastructure. That was the reason why they started an immense project led by Gen Medvedev. It began in 1946 and lasted a year at the Central School of Military Kynology, a department of the USSR Ministry of Defense. After many years of experiments of crossbreeding purebred dogs, the Moscow Watchdog was one of the most successful breeds from crosses between Caucasian Shepherd Dogs and St. Bernards. It provides the mental and physical aspect that they desired.

In 1986, the first few Moscow watchdogs were brought to Hungary for breeders to help popularize the breed. Future growth was guaranteed by devoted breeders and also the breed owner, Club Karakán. In addition, dozens of breeders from the former Soviet states had also worked with the breed to ensure their existence for the future. At the time, around 500 Moscow Watchdogs could be found in Hungary.

The breed standard was first published in 1985 when it received "official status" in the Soviet Union.  In 1992, it was approved by the Federation of the Dog Breeders of Russia and in 1997, by the Department of Animal Breeding and Pedigree of the Ministry of Agriculture of Russia. The standard was also approved by the Russian Kennel Club in 1997.

The Russian Kennel Club is working with the International Kennel Federation (FCI) to gain official recognition.  Currently, the Moscow Watchdog is considered by the FCI as part of the 2nd group Molosser.  In FCI sanctioned dog shows, they are shown in what is referred to as a "Special Show."  Inside Russia, they are widely shown and a recognized breed.

See also
 Dogs portal
 List of dog breeds

References

External links 
Russian Cynologycal Federation

Dog breeds originating in Russia
Dog breeds originating in the Soviet Union
Livestock guardian dogs